Orchid is an unincorporated community in northwest DeKalb County, in the U.S. state of Missouri.

The community is on Missouri Route 31 approximately four miles southeast of Union Star and 9.5 miles northwest of Maysville.

History
The Orchid post office closed in 1900. The community probably was named after the orchid plant.

References

Unincorporated communities in DeKalb County, Missouri
Unincorporated communities in Missouri